Ravi Gangadhar Rana is an Indian independent politician, a 3rd time MLA presently representing the Badnera (Vidhan Sabha constituency) in Amravati District of Vidarbha region of Maharashtra in its 13th Maharashtra Legislative Assembly.

Life and career
Rana hails from Shankarnagar, Amravati and was born to Gangadhar Narayan Rana. He completed his SSC in 1996 and HSC in 1998 from Amravati Board. He is a graduate with bachelor of commerce degree in 2000 from Amravati College. 

He married former Telugu actress Navneet Kaur in a mass marriage ceremony. This event took place on 3 February 2011 in the presence of many political leaders and VIPs. The then Chief Minister of Maharashtra Prithviraj Chavan and Baba Ramdev, remained present to bless the newly wedded couple in the same event. Navneet later went on to win the elections to become a Member of Parliament.

In 2011, he did an indefinite fast in central jail for farmers to get fair price for their products. On 6 October 2015, Rana stopped an encroachment on a single local barber shop.

In 2019 the elections for the Maharashtra  Vidhan Sabha, he defeated Shiv Sena candidate Priti Sanjay Band with a margin of 15541 votes and became MLA for the third time in a row. After that, Rana pledged to support the Bharatiya Janata Party unconditionally.

In April 2020, the Maharashtra police invoked IPC section 188, that is disobedience to order duly promulgated by public servant, against Rana and his aides when they broke the law; removed barricades to reach Irwin Square for paying tributes to B R Ambedkar amid a nationwide punctuated COVID-19 lockdown by the central government. In April 2022, Rana and his wife Navneet were arrested by Mumbai police following their insistence to recite Hanuman Chalisa in front of Matoshree the residence of Maharashtra CM Uddhav Thackeray. Later they were sent to 14 days of judicial custody on the orders of local magistrate. They were granted bail in Hanuman chalisa row on a bond of ₹50,000 and directed not to speak to the media about the case on 4th of May 2022.

References

1970s births
Maharashtra MLAs 2014–2019
Living people
Independent politicians in India
People from Amravati district